Ștefan Mihăilescu-Brăila (3 February 1925 – 19 September 1996) was a Romanian actor. He appeared in more than fifty films from 1959 to 1984.

Selected filmography

References

External links 

1925 births
1996 deaths
Romanian male film actors